= La Hoyada =

Coordinates: 26°33′S 66°22′W

- Municipality and village
- Interactive map of La Hoyada
- Country: Argentina
- Province: Catamarca Province
- Time zone: UTC−3 (ART)

La Hoyada is a village and municipality in Catamarca Province in northwestern Argentina.
